German submarine U-990 was a Type VIIC U-boat built for Nazi Germany's Kriegsmarine for service during World War II.
She was laid down on 17 October 1942 by Blohm & Voss, Hamburg as yard number 190, launched on 16 June 1943 and commissioned on 28 July 1943 under Kapitänleutnant Hubert Nordheimer.

Design
German Type VIIC submarines were preceded by the shorter Type VIIB submarines. U-990 had a displacement of  when at the surface and  while submerged. She had two shafts and two  propellers.

U-990 was fitted with five  torpedo tubes (four fitted at the bow and one at the stern), fourteen torpedoes, one  SK C/35 naval gun, 220 rounds, and one twin  C/30 anti-aircraft gun. The boat had a crew sized between forty-four and sixty.

Service history
The boat's career began with training at 5th Flotilla on 28 July 1943, followed by active service on 1 January 1944 as part of the 11th Flotilla.

Wolfpacks
U-990 took part in four wolfpacks, namely:
 Werwolf (28 January – 27 February 1944)
 Orkan (5 – 10 March 1944)
 Hammer (10 – 26 March 1944)
 Blitz (2 – 4 April 1944)

Fate
U-990 was sunk on 25 May 1944 in the Norwegian Sea at  after being depth charged by a RAF Liberator bomber of 59 Squadron.

Sqn Ldr B. Sisson sighted U-990 on the surface at 06:23 and attacked under cover of a rain squall, dropping six depth charges. Following the attack, the submarine could be seen sinking amid a large oil slick.

There were 20 crew killed, and 33 survivors.

Summary of raiding history

References

Notes

Citations

Bibliography

External links

German Type VIIC submarines
1943 ships
U-boats commissioned in 1943
U-boats sunk in 1944
World War II submarines of Germany
Ships built in Hamburg
U-boats sunk by depth charges
U-boats sunk by British aircraft
World War II shipwrecks in the Norwegian Sea
Maritime incidents in May 1944